Ludwig Kögl (born 7 March 1966) is a German former professional footballer who played as a midfielder.

Club career 
Kögl was born in Penzberg. He played more than 300 (West) German top-flight for FC Bayern Munich, VfB Stuttgart and SpVgg Unterhaching, and won six (West) German titles. The Bavarian helped Bayern to the 1987 European Cup final where he scored, giving them a first-half lead. They would, however, go on to lose the game 2–1 to FC Porto.

International career 
Kögl won two caps for West Germany in 1985.

Honours 
Bayern Munich
 Bundesliga: 1984–85, 1985–86, 1986–87, 1988–89, 1989–90
 DFB-Pokal: 1985–86; runner-up 1984–85
 European Cup: runner-up 1986–87

VfB Stuttgart
 Bundesliga: 1991–92
 DFL-Supercup: 1992

References

External links 
 
 
 
 
 

1966 births
Living people
People from Weilheim-Schongau
Sportspeople from Upper Bavaria
German footballers
Germany international footballers
Germany under-21 international footballers
Association football midfielders
Bundesliga players
Swiss Super League players
TSV 1860 Munich players
FC Bayern Munich footballers
VfB Stuttgart players
FC Luzern players
SpVgg Unterhaching players
Expatriate footballers in Switzerland
Association football agents
German sports agents
Footballers from Bavaria
German expatriate sportspeople in Switzerland
West German footballers